The 2019 American League Wild Card Game was a play-in game during Major League Baseball's (MLB) 2019 postseason contested between the American League's two wild card teams, the Oakland Athletics and Tampa Bay Rays. It was played on October 2, with Tampa Bay advancing to the American League Division Series to face the Houston Astros. The game was televised nationally by ESPN, and was sponsored by Hankook Tire for the second straight year. An alternate telecast, featuring Statcast analytics and sponsored by Amazon Web Services, aired on ESPN2. The game set the record for the highest attendance at a wild card game with an attendance of 54,005.

For the third straight year, Major League Baseball sold presenting sponsorships to all of its postseason series; as with the 2019 NL Wild Card Game, this wild-card game was again presented by sponsor Hankook Tire and officially known as the 2019 American League Wild Card Game presented by Hankook Tire.

Background

Oakland entered the game with a 97–65 record, while Tampa Bay was 96–66. They met seven times during the regular season, with Oakland winning the season series 4–3.

The Oakland Athletics secured a berth in the Wild Card Game on September 27. The Athletics finished second in the American League West, behind the Houston Astros. Oakland secured home field advantage on September 28. This was Oakland's third postseason appearance as a wild card team. They previously appeared in the 2014 and 2018 Wild Card Games, losing both.

The Tampa Bay Rays also secured a Wild Card berth on September 27. They finished second in the American League East, behind the New York Yankees. This was Tampa Bay's third postseason appearance as a wild card team. They previously appeared in one Wild Card Game, a win in 2013.

Game results

Line score

The Rays took an early lead in the first inning courtesy of a leadoff home run by Yandy Díaz off Oakland starter Sean Manaea. Manaea gave up a single to Matt Duffy to begin the second inning, and Avisaíl García promptly homered to extend Tampa Bay's lead to 3–0. When Manaea gave up another home run to Díaz in the third inning, he was lifted in favor of Yusmeiro Petit. The Athletics scored their lone run of the game in the bottom of the third, when a throwing error by Mike Brosseau allowed Marcus Semien to reach third base and Ramón Laureano drove him in with a sacrifice fly. However, Tommy Pham's fifth inning home run off Petit again gave the Rays a four-run lead. Charlie Morton was relieved after the bottom of the fifth by Diego Castillo, Nick Anderson, and Emilio Pagán, who combined for four scoreless innings to seal the victory for Tampa Bay. For Oakland, it was their 30th straight year without a title.

See also
 2019 National League Wild Card Game

References

Further reading

External links
Major League Baseball postseason schedule

American League Wild Card Game
Major League Baseball Wild Card Game
American League Wild Card
Oakland Athletics postseason
Tampa Bay Rays postseason
2010s in Oakland, California
2019 in sports in California